Helina baoshanensis is a species of fly from Helina genus, Muscidae family, described by Xue and Li in 2000.

Is endemic in Yunnan. According to Catalogue of Life, Helina baoshanensis do not have known subspecies.

References 

Muscidae
Insects described in 2000
Diptera of Asia